The Oslo Winter Park at Tryvann is a ski resort in Oslo, Norway. It is the most used ski resort of Norway. In the 1930s, the ski slope Tryvannskleiva was constructed, and the first race was held in 1933. The ski slope was later expanded with Tommkleiva, Wyllerløypa and finally with Tryvann Ski Resort. As of winter of 2010, the resort has 14 slopes and 7 lifts. There is only  walking or bus distance from the Voksenkollen metro station.

Ski slopes

References

External links
Official website Oslo Vinterpark 
The alpine area in the middle of Oslo 
Time table, T-bane (Metro) to Frognerseteren (Tryvann Skiresort) 

Ski areas and resorts in Norway
Sports venues in Oslo